Jure Zrimšek (born 20 January 1982) is a Slovenian cyclist.

Major results

2002
 1st European U23 Points Race Championships
 1st Stage 2 Olympia's Tour
3rd European U23 Time Trial Championships
2003
 1st Stage 1 Tour of Slovenia
2nd European U23 Time Trial Championships
3rd Ruota d'Oro
2004
 1st Overall Jadranska Magistrala
1st Stage 1
 2nd Trofeo Banca Popolare di Vicenza
2005
 3rd Grand Prix Rudy Dhaenens
2007
 1st Prologue Tour of Croatia
2008
 3rd National Time Trial Championships
2010
 1st Banja Luka–Belgrade I
2011
 1st Grand Prix Šenčur
 3rd Poreč Trophy

References

1982 births
Living people
Slovenian male cyclists